Tania Maria Tupu (born 28 December 1973) is a New Zealand former basketball player who competed in the 2000 Summer Olympics and in the 2004 Summer Olympics. Tupu also competed for New Zealand at the 1994 World Championship held in Australia. She is married to former NBL player Chris Tupu.

As coach of the Tokomanawa Queens, Tupa guided the team to the inaugural Tauihi Basketball Aotearoa championship in 2022.

References

1973 births
Living people
New Zealand women's basketball players
Olympic basketball players of New Zealand
Basketball players at the 2000 Summer Olympics
Basketball players at the 2004 Summer Olympics
Tauihi Basketball Aotearoa coaches
New Zealand basketball coaches